Schlierseer Bauerntheater is a theatre in Schliersee, Bavaria, Germany.

Theatres in Bavaria